Erling Evensen (April 29, 1914 – July 31, 1998) was a Norwegian cross-country skier who competed during the 1940s. He won a bronze medal in the 4 × 10 km relay at the 1948 Winter Olympics in St. Moritz. Evensen also finished 15th in the 18 km event at those same games.

Cross-country skiing results

Olympic Games

World Championships

References

External links
18 km results - 1948 Winter Olympics
Erling Evensen at Sports Reference

1914 births
1998 deaths
Norwegian male cross-country skiers
Cross-country skiers at the 1948 Winter Olympics
Olympic cross-country skiers of Norway
Olympic bronze medalists for Norway
Olympic medalists in cross-country skiing
Medalists at the 1948 Winter Olympics